The 1991 UAB Blazers football team represented the University of Alabama at Birmingham (UAB) in the 1991 NCAA Division III football season, and was the first team fielded by the school. The Blazers' head coach was Jim Hilyer. They played their home games at Legion Field in Birmingham, Alabama and competed as an NCAA Division III independent. The Blazers finished their inaugural season with a record of 4–3–2.

Schedule

References

UAB
UAB Blazers football seasons
UAB Blazers football